Johnny Golden (April 2, 1896 – January 27, 1936) was an American professional golfer.

Career
Born in Tuxedo, New York, Golden won nine times on the PGA Tour in the 1920s and 1930s. He played on the first two Ryder Cup teams in 1927 and 1929, compiling a perfect 3-0-0 record, with an 8 & 7 rout of Herbert Jolly in singles in 1927 at Worcester Country Club. His two other Ryder Cup match wins came with Walter Hagen as his teammate, winning foursomes in 1927 and in 1929, at Moortown Golf Club near Leeds, England.

Golden turned professional in 1915 and was an assistant pro and later head pro at the Tuxedo Club until 1929 when he took the head job at North Jersey Country Club in Paterson, New Jersey. During his time at the Tuxedo Club, he was a three-time semifinalist in the PGA Championship. In 1922, he lost to Emmet French. In 1926, he dropped a semifinal match to Leo Diegel, and the following year he lost in the semis to Joe Turnesa. Golden remained in Paterson for just a year, leaving for the head professional job at Wee Burn Country Club near Darien, Connecticut. While serving as the pro at Wee Burn, Golden won four consecutive Connecticut Open titles (1932–35), with the 1932, 1933 and 1935 events part of the official PGA schedule. His most lucrative win came in 1931, at the Agua Caliente Open in Mexico. Golden finished regulation tied with George Von Elm at 293. The duo agreed prior to the playoff to split first- and second-prize money, a common practice, with each player pocketing $6,750. Golden went on to win the playoff. Without the agreement, he would have won $10,000.

Death and legacy
In January 1936, Golden died at age 39 in Stamford, Connecticut from pneumonia. He was elected to the Connecticut Golf Hall of Fame in 2000.

Professional wins

PGA Tour wins (9)
1927 (1) New Jersey Open
1928 (1) New Jersey Open
1929 (2) La Jolla Open, New Jersey Open
1931 (1) Agua Caliente Open
1932 (2) North and South Open, Connecticut Open
1933 (1) Connecticut Open
1935 (1) Connecticut Open

Other wins
this list may be incomplete
1934 Connecticut Open

Results in major championships

NYF = Tournament not yet founded
R64, R32, R16, QF, SF = Round in which player lost in PGA Championship match play
"T" indicates a tie for a place

Summary

Most consecutive cuts made – 31 (all)
Longest streak of top-10s – 4 (1921 PGA – 1923 PGA)

See also
List of golfers with most PGA Tour wins

References

American male golfers
PGA Tour golfers
Ryder Cup competitors for the United States
Golfers from New York (state)
Golfers from Connecticut
People from Tuxedo, New York
People from Darien, Connecticut
1896 births
1936 deaths